

Seeds

Draw

Final

Top half

Bottom half 

1985 Grand Prix (tennis)